The Inspector General of Police, abbreviated as IGP is the head of the Nigeria Police Force. He is the most senior officer in the police service. The pioneer IGP is Louis Edet and the current IGP is Usman Alkali Baba.

Appointment
The appointed officer is usually a serving officer of the Nigeria Police Force and are often recommended by the Police Service Commission to the President of Nigeria, who will send the name to the Senate for confirmation.

Past IGP
Louis Edet (1964 - 1966)
Kam Salem (1966 - 1974)
Muhammadu Dikko Yusufu (1975 - 1979)
Adamu Suleiman (1979 - 1981)
Sunday Adewusi (1981 - 1983)
Etim Inyang (1985 - 1986)
Muhammadu Gambo Jimeta (1986 - 1990)
Aliyu Attah (1990 - 1993)
Ibrahim Coomassie (1993 - 1999)
Musiliu Smith (1999 - 2002)
Mustafa Adebayo Balogun (2002 - 2005)
Sunday Ehindero (2005 - 2007)
Mike Mbama Okiro (2007 - 2009)
Ogbonna Okechukwu Onovo (2009 - 2010)
Hafiz Ringim (2010 - 2012)
Mohammed Dikko Abubakar (2012 - 2014)
Suleiman Abba (2014 - 2015)
Solomon Arase (2015-2016)
Ibrahim Kpotun Idris (2016-2019)
Mohammed Adamu (2019-2021)
Usman Alkali Baba (2021-)

References

Law enforcement in Nigeria